Mighell is a rural locality in the Cassowary Coast Region, Queensland, Australia.

History 
The locality was named after Innisfail solicitor and businessman Norman Mighell.

Innisfail State High School opened on 24 January 1955 and operated until the end of 2009 at 2 Stitt Street. In 2010,  it was amalgamated with the Innisfail Inclusive Education Centre (a special education facility) and Tropical North Queensland TAFE (Innisfail Campus) to form Innisfail State College using the site of the TAFE campus at Innisfail Estate. Innisfail State High School's website was archived.

References 

Cassowary Coast Region
Localities in Queensland